Jodi Carlisle (born August 28, 1960 in Joliet, Illinois) is an American actress who has appeared in 46 television shows, 5 feature films, 6 videogames and 4 television movies as well as a number of stage plays. Carlisle is perhaps best known as one of the principal voice actors on the children's animated TV series The Wild Thornberrys.

Career

Voice roles
Jodi Carlisle has been performing voice work since 1982, beginning with the cartoon series Pac-Man. Two of her main voice roles were the characters of Wendy Richter and The Fabulous Moolah on the Hulk Hogan's Rock 'n' Wrestling Saturday morning cartoon series. In 1991, she voiced Dr. Sara Bellum in 5 episodes of Darkwing Duck. From 1992-1993, Carlisle provided additional voices in 26 episodes of Wild West C.O.W.-Boys of Moo Mesa. There have also been four voice roles in video games and a number of audiobook narrations.

Perhaps her most popular voice performance was the clan mother character of Marianne Thornberry in the Nickelodeon animated TV series The Wild Thornberrys, voicing in all 90 episodes which ran from 1998 to 2004 as well as the feature films The Wild Thornberrys Movie released 2002 and Rugrats Go Wild released 2003. Both films were a success at the box office, grossing $60 million and $50 million respectively; however the critical reception was more favourable for The Wild Thornberrys Movie than Rugrats Go Wild with Rotten Tomatoes scores of 80% and 41%.

Live-action roles
In the field of live-action television, Jodi Carlisle has been unable to make a significant impact and hasn't been given a breakthrough role. A large collection of minor parts and guest star roles include 2 episodes each of Desperate Housewives and Criminal Minds: Suspect Behavior, with single appearances in CSI: Crime Scene Investigation, CSI: Miami, Night Court, Malcolm in the Middle, Ugly Betty and That '70s Show. Also, there came the roles of Jean Trull and Dr Gropeman in eight episodes of the web comedy series Ave 43. Prior to her acting and voice work, Carlisle was a contestant on The Joker's Wild and during her career she later appeared as a contestant on Tic-Tac-Dough.

Stage roles
Carlisle is an accomplished stage actress and has appeared in many productions, including musicals where her powerful singing voice has been displayed. Most of her roles have been with the Colony Theatre Company based in Los Angeles where Carlisle is an Associate Artist; in productions including Fuddy Meers, A Hole in the Dark, The Matchmaker, Heartbreak Hotel, Picnic, King of Hearts, Working, Passions, Tomfoolery, Could I Have This Dance?, The Man Who Came to Dinner, The Laramie Project and Einstein and the Polar Bear.

Another Colony production, How to Succeed in Business Without Really Trying was reviewed by Julio Martinez for Variety where he commented "Jodi Carlisle exhibits one of the more adroit musical comedy voices as Smitty, belting out such ditties as "Coffee Break", "Been a Long Day" and "Paris Original". More praise came in another Variety review, this time for A Hole in the Dark, where Terry Morgan commented "Miranda goes through more changes than any other character, and local acting treasure Carlisle is equal to every challenge with her robust and rollicking performance." In 1997, Carlisle received the annual LA Drama Critics Circle Natalie Schafer Award.

Filmography

Film

Video games

Television

Other works
Associate Artist with the Colony Theater in Los Angeles, where she has appeared in numerous productions.
(1983-1984): Various voices and characters on "Newsrag," a weekly satirical show on KROQ in Los Angeles.
(February 2003): Plays Gertie in "Fuddy Meers" play by David Lindsay-Abaire (Colony Theater, New York City, New York, USA).
(May 2006): Plays Miranda Rosehue in "A Hole in the Dark" play by Hilly Hicks Jr. (2nd Stage Theatre, Hollywood, California, USA).

References

External links
 

1960 births
Living people
American voice actresses
American film actresses
American television actresses
American stage actresses
American video game actresses
Actresses from Illinois
People from Joliet, Illinois
21st-century American women